Xylota flavipes is a species of hoverfly in the family Syrphidae.

Distribution
Taiwan.

References

Eristalinae
Insects described in 1927
Taxa named by Pius Sack
Diptera of Asia